Valery Pavlovich Serdyukov (born 9 November 1945, in Kharashouka, Homiel Voblast, Byelorussian SSR) is Russian politician who served as governor of Leningrad Oblast in Russia (1998–2012).

Serdyukov graduated from the Saint Petersburg Mining Institute with a degree in economics.

He was appointed by the oblast governor as vice-governor in charge of industry, energy, and the environment in 1996, made lieutenant governor in December 1997, and served as acting governor since September 18, 1998. Serdyukov was elected governor in 1999 and again in 2003. In 2007, he was reappointed as governor by Vladimir Putin, the then-President of Russia, following a Kremlin-sponsored law which allowed regional governors to be appointed by the president instead of being popularly elected.

In 2012, he was replaced by Alexander Drozdenko as governor.

Personal life 
Serdyukov enjoys chess. He is married and has two adult sons and three grandchildren.

Honours and awards 
 Order of Merit for the Fatherland 3rd class
 Order of Honour
 Order of Labour Glory 3rd class
 Medal "In Commemoration of the 300th Anniversary of Saint Petersburg"
 Order of Merit (Belarus)
 Order of Merit 3rd class (Ukraine)
 Order of Civil Merit

External links 
  Official website of Leningrad Oblast. Biography of Valery Serdyukov
  Valery Serdyukov's blog

1945 births
Living people
People from Buda-Kashalyowa District
Communist Party of the Soviet Union members
Governors of Leningrad Oblast
Russian people of Belarusian descent
United Russia politicians
21st-century Russian politicians